The Canyon Group is a geologic group in Texas. It preserves fossils dating back to the Carboniferous period. It contains the Caddo Creek, Graford, Palo Pinto, Wolf Mountain Shale and Winchell Formations.

See also 

 List of fossiliferous stratigraphic units in Texas
 Paleontology in Texas

References

Further reading 
 F. B. Plummer and G. Scott. 1937. Upper Paleozoic ammonites in Texas. The University of Texas Bulletin 3701:1-516
 J. K. Rigby, M. G. McKinzie, and B. B. Britt. 2008. Pennsylvanian sponges from the Graford Formation, Wise County, Texas. Journal of Paleontology 82(3):492-510

Geologic groups of Texas
Geologic formations of Texas
Carboniferous Texas